Dina Alekseyevna Averina (born 13 August 1998) is a Russian individual rhythmic gymnast. She is the 2020 Olympic All-around silver medalist, the only four-time (2021, 2019, 2018, 2017) World All-around Champion, the 2018 silver and 2021 European All-around bronze medalist and the 2016 Grand Prix Final All-around silver medalist. On a National level, she is the 2017, 2018 and 2022 Russian National All-around champion and the 2013 Russian Junior All-around bronze medalist. Her identical twin sister, Arina Averina, is also a competitive rhythmic gymnast.

Personal life 
Born to parents Ksenia Averina and Alexey Averin, Dina and Arina started gymnastics at four years old. Dina and her identical twin sister Arina Averina were born on 13 August 1998. Arina was born 20 minutes ahead of Dina, while both have moles on the upper cheekbone (near the right ear), Dina has it on the lower right compared to Arina's upper right. Her twin sister, Arina has a scar above her right eye, caused after an accident with a club. They have an older sister named Polina. Dina and Arina share the same instagram account.

On 18 March 2022 Averina, as well as her sister, participated in the Moscow rally in support of the Russian invasion of Ukraine.

Career

Junior
The Averinas (Dina and Arina) first trained under their first coach Larisa Belova until they became members of the Russian national team and began training in Olympic Training Center in Moscow where they are now coached by Vera Shatalina.

The Averinas began appearing in international competitions in 2011 competing at the 2011 Russian-Chinese Youth Games where Dina won the gold and Arina finishing 5th in the all-around. In 2012, Dina finished 4th at the Russian Junior Championships. Dina and Arina both competed at the Venera Cup in Eilat, Israel where Dina won the all-around gold, she also won gold in hoop and silver medals in ball, clubs and ribbon. She then competed at International MTM Cup in Ljubljana (along with teammates Aleksandra Soldatova and Arina Averina) won the Team gold medal.

In 2013 season, Dina won bronze in all-around at the 2013 Russian Junior Championships behind Soldatova, she competed in Junior division at Happy Caravan Cup in Tashkent and won Team gold with Arina Averina. At the 2013 Russian Spartakiada's 6th Summer Student Games, Dina won the all-around bronze medal.

Senior

2014 
In 2014 Season, Dina debuted at the 2014 Moscow Grand Prix competing in the senior international tournament division. Dina appeared in her first World Cup competition at the 2014 Lisboa World Cup where she won the all-around bronze medal behind Melitina Staniouta. In the event finals: she won silver in clubs and bronze in ribbon. On 23–27 April, Dina competed in senior nationals at the 2014 Russian Championships where she finished 6th in the all-around.

2015 
In 2015 season, Dina started her season at the 2015 Moscow Grand Prix, she then competed at the Corbeil-Essonnes International Rhythmic Gymnastics Tournament where she won the all-around silver medal behind twin sister Arina Averina, she qualified to 4 event finals, taking gold in ribbon (tied with Arina), silver medals in hoop, ball and placed 6th in clubs. On 7–9 August, Dina competed at the MTK Budapest taking gold in the all-around, hoop, ball, clubs and a silver in ribbon. Dina followed another gold medal win in the all-around at the 2015 Dundee International Tournament in Sofia, ahead of twin sister Arina.

2016 
In 2016, Dina began her season competing at the 2016 Grand Prix Moscow finishing 6th in the all-around and qualified to the hoop final. On 26–28 February, Dina competed in the first World Cup of the season at the 2016 Espoo World Cup finishing 6th in the all-around; she won bronze in ball, placed 4th in hoop, clubs and 6th in ribbon. Dina then competed in the senior division at the International tournament in Lisbon where she won the all-around gold and all apparatus finals. At the 30th Thiais Grand Prix event in Paris, Dina finished 9th in the all-around. On 1–3 April, Dina competed at the 2016 Pesaro World Cup where she finished 5th in the all-around with a total of 73.500 points, she qualified in all apparatus after teammate Yana Kudryavtseva withdrew from the event finals, Dina won silver in ball, ribbon and bronze in hoop, clubs. Dina won the all-around bronze at the 2016 Russian Championships held in Sochi. On 6–8 May, Dina competed at the Brno Grand Prix taking bronze in the all-around with a total of 72.850 points; she qualified to 3 apparatus taking silver in hoop, ribbon and placed 4th in clubs. On 13–15 May, Dina won the all-around bronze at the Bucharest Grand Prix with a total of 73.100 points, she qualified to all apparatus finals: taking silver in clubs behind Salome Pazhava, bronze in hoop, ball (tied with Katsiaryna Halkina) and 7th in ribbon. On 27–29 May, Dina finished 5th in the all-around at the 2016 Sofia World Cup with a total of 72.900 points, she qualified in hoop finals placing 4th behind sister Arina Averina. On 1–3 July, Dina competed at the 2016 Berlin World Cup where she won the All-around gold medal with a total of 74.050 points, she qualified to all apparatus taking gold in Ball, Ribbon, placed 4th in Hoop and 8th in Clubs. On 22–24 September, Dina competed at the 2016 Grand Prix Final in Eilat, Israel where she won the all-around bronze medal with a new personal best total of 74.450 points, she qualified in 2 apparatus finals taking silver medal in ball and placed 5th in clubs.

2017 
In 2017, Dina's season began in competition at the 2017 Grand Prix Moscow where she won the all-around gold medal with a new personal best total score of 76.050 points, she qualified to all the apparatus finals taking gold in hoop, clubs, ribbon and a silver medal in ball behind Aleksandra Soldatova. Dina then participated in the organized Desio-Italia Trophy where she won the All-around and team gold medal (together with Twin Sister Arina). On 10–12 March, Dina became the All-around champion at the 2017 Russian Championships ahead of defending champion Aleksandra Soldatova who finished in 2nd place respectively. On 24–26 March, Dina then competed at the Thiais Grand Prix where she won the all-around gold with a total of 74.500 points, she qualified to all the event finals taking gold in hoop, ball, clubs and silver in ribbon. On 7–9 April, Dina competed in the first World Cup of the season at the 2017 Pesaro World Cup where she won silver in the all-around behind teammate Aleksandra Soldatova, she qualified to all the apparatus finals winning 3 gold medals in ball, clubs, ribbon and a silver in hoop. Her next event was at the 2017 Tashkent World Cup where Dina won gold in the all-around ahead of sister Arina Averina, she qualified to all the apparatus finals taking gold in clubs, and 3 silver medals in ball, hoop and ribbon. On 19–21 May, at the 2017 European Championships in Budapest, Hungary, Dina was member of the Golden winning Russian Team (together with senior individuals: twin sister Arina Averina, Aleksandra Soldatova and the junior group) scoring a total of 182.175 points which was more than 11 points ahead of their nearest competitor team Belarus. Dina qualified to 3 apparatus finals taking 2 gold medals in hoop, ribbon and a silver medal in clubs behind Arina Averina. On 23–26 June, Dina then competed at the 2017 Holon Grand Prix taking silver in the all-around behind Arina, she qualified 3 apparatus finals winning gold in ball, silver in clubs and placed 6th in hoop. At the quadrennial 2017 World Games which was held in Wrocław, Poland from 20 to 30 July, Dina won the gold medal in clubs and three silver medals in hoop, ball, ribbon. On 11–13 August, Dina competed at the 2017 Kazan World Challenge Cup and won the all-around gold medal edging out sister Arina who won the silver medal, Dina qualified in all the apparatus finals and won 2 gold medals in hoop, clubs, a silver in ribbon and finished 8th in ball. At the 2017 World Championships held on 30 August – 3 September in Pesaro, Italy, in the first day of the apparatus finals; Dina won Gold in Hoop (19.100) and Silver in Ball (18.700). The following day, she won another Gold in Clubs (19.000) and Silver in Ribbon (17.200). During the individual all-around finals, she accumulated scores in (Hoop: 18.850, Ball: 18.550, Clubs: 18.850, Ribbon: 18.450) scoring a total of 74.700 points to become the new All-around Champion edging out twin sister Arina Averina who took the silver medal respectively.

2018 
In 2018, Dina's season began in competition at the 2018 Grand Prix Moscow, where she won the all-around gold, she qualified to 3 apparatus finals taking gold with hoop, clubs and silver with ball. On 24–25 March, Dina took gold in the all-around at the 2018 Thiais Grand Prix; she qualified in 3 apparatus finals where she won gold in ball, ribbon and silver in clubs. On 13–15 April, Dina then competed at the 2018 Pesaro World Cup, winning gold in the all-around; in the event finals, she won gold in ball and clubs, a silver in hoop and placed 4th in ribbon. She competed at the 2018 Sofia World Championships, winning Gold in the All-Around, Hoop, Ball and Clubs.

2019 
Dina won gold in team, hoop and ribbon at the 2019 European Championships. She also competed at the 2019 European Games, winning gold in all-around, hoop and ribbon, silver in clubs and bronze in ball.

2021 
Dina started the season at the Moscow Grand Prix, where she won gold ahead of her silver and bronze compatriots Arina Averina and Lala Kramarenko. In the finals of apparatus, she won gold in ball and ribbon, silver in hoop and bronze in clubs. At the Tashkent World Cup, she also won full gold ahead of Arina Averina and Anastasiia Salos, and gold on hoop, silver on ball and clubs, and bronze on ribbon in the finals. In the Pesaro World Cup, she also achieved full gold ahead of Arina Averina and Alina Harnasko, and in the finals, she achieved gold in hoop, silver in ball and ribbon, and bronze in clubs. From 9–13 June, she competed in the European Rhythmic Gymnastics Championships, in Varna, Bulgaria, achieving bronze in the general final, behind Boryana Kaleyn, and in the apparatus finals she achieved gold in hoop, ball and ribbon, and silver in clubs. By teams with Lala Kramarenko, Arina Averina and the Russian group, they achieved first place. At the Moscow Challenge World Cup, the last competition prior to the Olympic Games, she achieved complete gold ahead of Lala Kramarenko and Ekaterina Vedeneeva, and took gold in all apparatus finals. Her sister Arina, was removed from the competition list the day before, and was replaced by Kramarenko.

At the 2020 Tokyo Olympics, Dina lost to Linoy Ashram from Israel and finished second with a silver medal, thus Russia finished for the first time without a gold medal in the sport since 1996.

After the Olympic Games 
Later, the Averinas twins returned to comp after the Olympic Games with their new coach Yulia Barsukova, at the international Olympico Cup tournament in Moscow, where Dina launched a new club routine, and her sister a new club and ribbon routine. Dina was champion ahead of Arina Averina and Elzhana Taniyeva. Dina competed in the Rhythmic Gymnastics World Championships in Kitakyushu, Japan, where in the apparatus finals she won gold in hoop, ball and clubs, and in ribbon she won silver, surpassed by Alina Harnasko. In the all-around final, Dina again took the all-around gold and the title of World Champion for the fourth time in a row, becoming the gymnast with the most world titles (Beating the record of Maria Gigova, Maria Petrova, Evgenia Kanaeva and Yana Kudryatseva) . She also achieved team gold with Arina Averina and the Russian Group

Gymnastics technique 
Dina is known for her fast routines and dynamic apparatus handling. She has maintained a Difficulty value of 10 which was scored in her clubs routine; the last rhythmic gymnast before Dina to score a 10 in Difficulty was Evgenia Kanaeva.

Routine music information

Detailed Olympic results

Competitive highlights
(Team competitions in seniors are held only at the World Championships, Europeans and other Continental Games.)

See also
Arina Averina

References

External links

 
 
 
 
  
 Averina Twins unofficial fan page
 

1998 births
Living people
Sports controversies
Russian rhythmic gymnasts
People from Zavolzhye, Nizhny Novgorod Oblast
Medalists at the Rhythmic Gymnastics World Championships
Gymnasts at the 2019 European Games
Identical twins
Twin sportspeople
Russian twins
European Games gold medalists for Russia
European Games silver medalists for Russia
European Games bronze medalists for Russia
European Games medalists in gymnastics
World Games gold medalists
World Games silver medalists
Medalists at the Rhythmic Gymnastics European Championships
Gymnasts at the 2020 Summer Olympics
Medalists at the 2020 Summer Olympics
Olympic medalists in gymnastics
Olympic silver medalists for the Russian Olympic Committee athletes
Sportspeople from Nizhny Novgorod Oblast